The Sheriff of Bombay is an apolitical titular position of authority bestowed for one year on a prominent citizen of Bombay.

The Sheriff is an officer of the High Court and the nominal Head of the High Court Department which carries out the orders of the High Court for summoning people, and also for attachment and sealing of properties and if ordered for their auction. The Sheriff has an office and staff but does not have any executive powers. The Sheriff office is in Bombay High Court, Fort on the Ground Floor. In the order of precedence, the Sheriff ranks just below the Mayor. Mumbai and Calcutta are the only cities in India to maintain this post.

The most important social function of the Sheriff is to receive foreign dignitaries at the airport on behalf of the city and to call condolence meetings on the demise of prominent citizens of the city.

The first Sheriff of Mumbai after independence was Mahadeo Laxman Dahanukar, a city businessman in 1948. His son, Shantaram Mahadeo Dahanukar was also a Sheriff of Mumbai in 1969.

The Sheriff presides over various city-related functions and conferences and is in charge of receiving foreign guests of the government. The post gives the incumbent close access to the Chief Minister of Maharashtra and the Municipal Commissioner of the city. It is often criticised by citizens as a waste of public money. As the post is apolitical, many prominent citizens use it as a platform to showcase their achievements and serve the citizens of the metropolis.

Former Sheriffs
Former Sheriffs include:

See also
 Brihanmumbai Municipal Corporation (BMC)
 Municipal Corporation Building, Mumbai (for details on the buildings architecture)
 Coat of arms of Mumbai
 Administrative divisions of Mumbai
 Mayor of Mumbai
 Municipal Commissioner of Mumbai
 Sheriff of Kolkata
 Sheriff of Madras

References

Government of Mumbai
 
Titles of national or ethnic leadership